Christian Reinsch (born 1934 in Chemnitz, passed away on October 8, 2022) was a German mathematician who worked in the area of numerical analysis.

Reinsch began studying physics in 1953 at the Technical University of Munich, graduating in 1958. He received his doctorate in 1961 studying under Heinz Maier-Leibnitz.

Among other things, he worked in the area of numerical linear algebra and interpolation with spline functions. Several of his works have over two thousand citations each.

Selected works
with James H. Wilkinson: Handbook of Automatic Computation II: Linear Algebra, Springer 1971. (Cited 4092 times, according to Google Scholar) 
Golub GH, Reinsch C. Singular value decomposition and least squares solutions. Linear algebra 14, 403–420 (1970). (Cited 4092 times, according to Google Scholar)  
Smoothing by Spline Functions. Numerische Mathematik, Vol 10, 1967, pp. 177–183. (Cited 2876 times, according to Google Scholar) 
Smoothing by Spline Functions II. Numerische Mathematik, Vol 16, 1971, pp. 451–454.
with H. Dauner: An analysis of two algorithms for shape-preserving cubic spline interpolation. IMA J. Num. Anal., Vol 9, 1989, pp. 299–314.
Software for shape-preserving spline interpolation. In: M. G. Cox, S. Hammarling, (Editors): Reliable Numerical Computation. Clarendon Press, Oxford,1990.

See also
Goertzel algorithm
QR algorithm
Singular value decomposition
Smoothing spline

References

External links 
Biography at the TU Munich
Personal website

20th-century German mathematicians
1934 births
Living people
People from Chemnitz
21st-century German mathematicians